The Philadelphia School of Anatomy was a medical college in Philadelphia which was established by James McClintock in 1838    that ran until 1875. From 1868 to 1875 it was run by William Williams Keen.

References

Medical schools in Pennsylvania
Educational institutions established in 1838
1875 disestablishments in Pennsylvania
History of Philadelphia
Healthcare in Philadelphia
Defunct universities and colleges in Philadelphia
1838 establishments in Pennsylvania
Defunct private universities and colleges in Pennsylvania